The county of West Sussex in South East England has 176 Grade I listed buildings.  Such buildings are described by English Heritage, the authority responsible for their designation, as "of exceptional interest [and] sometimes considered to be internationally important".  Grade I is the highest of the three grades of listed status in England: about 2.5% (or 9,300) of the country's 374,000 listed buildings have this designation.

West Sussex and its buildings

West Sussex, a non-metropolitan county, is divided for administrative purposes into seven local government districts, as marked on the map:

 Worthing
 Arun
 Chichester
 Horsham
 Crawley
 Mid Sussex
 Adur

Listed buildings in England
In England, a building or structure is defined as "listed" when it is placed on a statutory register of buildings of "special architectural or historic interest" by the Secretary of State for Culture, Media and Sport, a Government department, in accordance with the Planning (Listed Buildings and Conservation Areas) Act 1990 (a successor to the 1947 act).  English Heritage, a non-departmental public body, acts as an agency of this department to administer the process and advise the department on relevant issues.  There are three grades of listing status.  Grade I, the highest, is defined as being of "exceptional interest"; Grade II* is used for "particularly important buildings of more than special interest"; and Grade II, the lowest, is used for buildings of "special interest".  As of July 2009, about 374,000 buildings in England were listed.  Around 92% of these had the lowest designation, Grade II; 5.5% were listed at Grade II*; and about 2.5% had the highest grade.

Listed status gives buildings a degree of protection from unapproved alteration, demolition or other changes.  Local authorities must consult English Heritage when an application for alteration of a Grade I-listed building is made.

Adur

|}

Arun

|}

Chichester

|}

Crawley

|}

Horsham

|}

Mid Sussex

|}

Worthing

|}

Notes

References

Notes

External links

 
West Sussex
Lists of listed buildings in West Sussex